Ryan Nyhuis (born 6 September 1996) is a professional Australian rules footballer who last played for the Fremantle Football Club in the Australian Football League (AFL).

Drafted with the 34th selection in the 2016 rookie draft from the Nightcliff Football Club in the Northern Territory Football League (NTFL) and the Northern Territory Football Club in the North East Australian Football League (NEAFL), he played for Peel Thunder in the West Australian Football League (WAFL), Fremantle's reserve team during the 2016 season, including the club's first ever WAFL premiership.

Nyhuis continued to play for Peel throughout 2017 and made his AFL debut for Fremantle in round 16 of the 2017 AFL season against North Melbourne at Etihad Stadium, as a late replacement for David Mundy.  In a surprising move, Nyhuis played as a forward, despite having almost exclusively previously played as a defender.  He kicked a goal with his first kick in AFL football and then kicked a further three including the last two of the match to help Fremantle win by 4 points.
Nyhuis was delisted from Fremantle at the conclusion of the 2019 AFL season.

References

External links

WAFL Player Profile and Statistics

1996 births
Living people
Fremantle Football Club players
Nightcliff Football Club players
Peel Thunder Football Club players
Northern Territory Football Club players
Australian rules footballers from the Northern Territory
Australian people of Dutch descent
Claremont Football Club players